Lecanora mugambii is a species of crustose lichen in the family Lecanoraceae. Found in Kenya, it was described as new to science in 2011.

See also
List of Lecanora species

References

mugambii
Lichen species
Lichens described in 2011
Lichens of Kenya
Taxa named by Helge Thorsten Lumbsch